Victor Arthur Desjardins (July 4, 1898 – November 22, 1988) was an American ice hockey player. He played 87 games in the National Hockey League with the Chicago Black Hawks and New York Rangers during the 1930–31 and 1931–32 seasons. The rest of his career, which lasted from 1919 to 1938, was spent in various minor leagues. He was inducted into the United States Hockey Hall of Fame in 1974. He was born in Sault Ste. Marie, Michigan and was the nephew of Hockey Hall of Fame inductee Didier Pitre.

Career statistics

Regular season and playoffs

References

External links
 

1898 births
1988 deaths
American men's ice hockey centers
American people of French-Canadian descent
Central Hockey League (1925–1926) players
Chicago Blackhawks players
Eveleth Arrowheads players
Eveleth Rangers players
Ice hockey players from Michigan
Kansas City Greyhounds players
New York Rangers players
People from Sault Ste. Marie, Michigan
St. Paul Saints (AHA) players
Springfield Indians players
Tulsa Oilers (AHA) players
United States Hockey Hall of Fame inductees